John Victor Mackay (July 13, 1891 – September 8, 1945) was an American art director. He was nominated for three Academy Awards in the category Best Art Direction. He worked on 97 films between 1937 and 1943.

Selected filmography
Mackay was nominated for three Academy Awards for Best Art Direction:
 Manhattan Merry-Go-Round (1937)
 Man of Conquest (1939)
 Dark Command (1940)

References

External links

American art directors
1891 births
1945 deaths